Anaittha is a city in Mahottari District, Nepal, which is popular with tourists. Thareshwarnath and Tharhi pokhri is located here. The main work here is farming.

References

Mahottari District
Populated places in Mahottari District